Hooks is an unincorporated community in Madison Township, Armstrong County, Pennsylvania, United States. It is  miles north of Kittanning. Hooks is bordered on the east by the Allegheny River.

History
There is no record of a post office called Hooks.

References

Unincorporated communities in Armstrong County, Pennsylvania
Unincorporated communities in Pennsylvania